European route E 67 is an E-road running from Prague in the Czech Republic to Estonia and by ferry to Finland. It goes via Prague, Wrocław, Warsaw, Kaunas, Panevėžys, Riga, Tallinn, Helsinki.

It is a significant road connection between the Baltic states and Poland. 

The route is mostly ordinary road, but there are plans to convert it into a motorway or expressway, in Poland called S8 (326 of 379 km completed ) and S61 (178,6 of 235 km completed ). 
Along the Via Baltica highway, the stretch of European route E67 between Warsaw and Tallinn, a 5G mobile network will be built in order to facilitate self-driving vehicles and expand opportunities for freight carriers.

Environmental concerns 
The Via Baltica attracted great controversy in 2007, as its planned new express road was to take it through several areas in Poland of great natural value.  Most controversial was the Augustów bypass, which would take the route through the wetlands of the Rospuda Valley, the last area of its kind remaining in Europe, and an area protected by EU law as part of the European Natura 2000 Network.  In July 2007 Polish Prime Minister Jarosław Kaczyński halted work on the bypass after the European Commission applied for an immediate injunction.   After an intense campaign of protests in Poland and abroad and also counter-protests of the local community, the plans have been changed, and now the highway has been rerouted to completely avoid the wilderness area.

 
 Helsinki
: Helsinki – Tallinn

 : Tallinn – Laagri – Märjamaa – Pärnu-Jaagupi – Pärnu – Häädemeeste – Ikla – / border crossing

 : / border crossing – Ainaži – Salacgrīva – Saulkrasti – Ādaži – Riga
 : Riga
 : Riga
 : Riga
 : Riga – Iecava – Bauska – Grenctāle – / border crossing

 
 : / border crossing – Pasvalys – Panevėžys
 : Panevėžys
 : Panevėžys – Kėdainiai – Juodoniai
 : Juodoniai (Start of Concurrency with ) – Kaunas (End of Concurrency with )
 : Kaunas – Marijampolė – / border crossing

 : / border crossing –  Suwałki – Dowspuda
 : Dowspuda – Augustów – Białystok
 : Piotrków Trybunalski (Start of Concurrency with ) – Rokszyce – Łódź
 : Łódź (End of Concurrency with ) – Łask – Zduńska Wola – Sieradz – Kepno – Olesnica – Wrocław – Domasław
 : Domasław – Kobierzyce – Jordanów Śląski – Łagiewniki – Ząbkowice Śląskie – Klodzko – Kudowa-Zdrój – / border crossing

 : / border crossing – Náchod – Česká Skalice – Jaroměř – Smiřice – Hradec Králové
 : Hradec Králové
 : Hradec Králové – Chlumec nad Cidlinou – Poděbrady – Prague

See also 
Rail Baltica
Estonian national road 4
A1 road (Latvia)
A4 road (Latvia)
A6 road (Latvia)
A5 road (Latvia)
A7 road (Latvia)
A5 highway (Lithuania)
Expressway S61 (Poland)
Expressway S8 (Poland)
D11 motorway (Czech Republic)
Suwałki Gap, which the route crosses

References

External links 
 UN Economic Commission for Europe: Overall Map of E-road Network (2007)

67
E067
E067
E067
E067
E067
E067